Paymogo is a town and municipality located in the Andévalo comarca, province of Huelva, Spain. 
According to the 2014 census, the municipality has a population of 1,218 inhabitants.
The municipality borders with Portugal on its western side.

See also
Municipal elections in Paymogo

References

External links

Paymogo - Sistema de Información Multiterritorial de Andalucía

Municipalities in the Province of Huelva